Maliyapham Palcha (1359 BC-1329 BC), also known as Mari Ya Phambal Cha or Koi Koi, is a king of Ancient Manipur (Antique Kangleipak) kingdom. He is the successor and one of the nine sons of King Ningthou Kangba (1405 BC-1359 BC) as evident in the Ningthou Kangbalon.

He ascended the throne at the age of twenty five and introduced a calendar system called the Mari-Fam or Maliyapham (later known as the Meetei calendar).

He was succeeded by

Other website 

 https://books.google.co.in/books?id=9jtuAAAAMAAJ&dq=king+koi+koi+Manipur&focus=searchwithinvolume&q=koikoi

References 

Kings of Ancient Manipur
Meitei people
Pages with unreviewed translations